Aufderheide is a surname. Notable people with the surname include:
Charles Aufderheide (1918–1991), American technician
May Aufderheide (1888–1972), American composer
Patricia Aufderheide, American media studies scholar